"Heat of the Night" is a song written by Canadian rock musician Bryan Adams and Jim Vallance and performed by Adams. The song became the most successful song from Adams's album Into the Fire in 1987. It was released as the first single from Into the Fire and reached number 6 on the U.S. Billboard Hot 100 and number 2 on the U.S. Mainstream Rock Tracks chart.

The song is also featured on Adams's 1988 live concert album Live! Live! Live! and his greatest hits albums So Far So Good and Anthology.

The song is very popular among Bryan Adams fans and it won Canadian Music Publisher's Association Rock Song Of The Year Award. According to Billboard magazine, it was the 84th most-listened-to song of the year.

Background
The song was partly inspired by the film noir classic The Third Man, starring the actor-director Orson Welles. The darkness of the lyrics was further influenced by a trip Bryan and Jim Vallance took to Berlin in March 1986, before the wall came down.

Music video
The promo was directed by Wayne Isham and shot in black and white; it was also one of the rare songs/videos where Bryan himself plays lead guitar, instead of Keith Scott to whom he usually leaves the solo work.

A shot from recording sessions is used as the cover of Adams's album Into the Fire.

Chart positions

Personnel
Bryan Adams: lead and rhythm guitar, keyboards, vocals, backing vocals 
Jim Vallance: piano, percussion, drum programming 
Keith Scott: guitar harmonics, backing vocals
Robbie King: organ
Dave Taylor: bass
Mickey Curry: drums

References

1987 singles
Bryan Adams songs
Songs written by Bryan Adams
Songs written by Jim Vallance
Music videos directed by Wayne Isham
A&M Records singles
1986 songs